The Everglades Digital Library is hosted and supported by the Florida International University Libraries, in collaboration with Everglades National Park, the University of Florida Libraries, and numerous other agencies and research organizations. The Everglades Digital Library is a library with multiple large and growing collections that regularly add new materials, including scientific and technical reports, natural history writings, educational resources, maps, photographs, and additional contextual materials on and relating to the greater Everglades.

External links
Everglades Digital Library
Reclaiming the Everglades, one of the collections in the Everglades Digital Library
America's Swamp, one of the collections in the Everglades Digital Library

Everglades
Florida International University
University and college academic libraries in the United States
American digital libraries